The massacre of Phocaea (I Sfagí tis Fókaias; Turkish: Foça Katliamı) occurred in June 1914, as part of the ethnic cleansing policies of the Ottoman Empire that included exile, massacre and deportations. It was perpetrated by irregular Turkish bands against the predominantly ethnic Greek town of Phocaea, modern Foça, in the east coast of the Aegean Sea. The massacre was part of a wider anti-Greek campaign of genocide launched by the Young Turk Ottoman authorities, which included boycott, intimidation, forced deportations and mass killings; and was one of the worst attacks during the summer of 1914.

Background
In 1914, the Ottoman Empire had just emerged from the disastrous Balkan Wars, in which it had lost most of its European territories, except for Eastern Thrace, to the Christian Balkan League. Several tens of thousands of Balkan Muslims were streaming into the Empire as refugees.

At the same time tensions mounted with the Kingdom of Greece over possession of the islands of the northeastern Aegean, which Greece had captured during the wars. In February 1914, the Great Powers decided that Greece would keep most of them, a decision that the Ottoman government rejected. A Greco-Ottoman naval race was the result, with threats of war over the issue of the islands. In this atmosphere, the Greek population of the Ottoman Empire became a target of the Young Turk Ottoman government, from a press campaign against them, limitations to the autonomy of their educational institutions, the imposition of military service, as well as various financial measures, culminating in a boycott of Greek-owned businesses.

The Young Turk leadership began implementing ethnic cleansing policies in the spring of 1914. The Greek communities of the Aegean region of Anatolia and Eastern Thrace were targeted, facing boycott, intimidation, attacks by irregulars and massacre. Some communities had the opportunity to avoid death by converting to Islam. In the Aidin Vilayet, on the Aegean coast of Anatolia, a total of 8,000–10,000 armed irregulars (bashi-bazouks) were operating as part of this campaign. According to reports submitted by the Danish consul of nearby Smyrna, Alfred Van de Zee, these groups were financed and run by the Ottoman state.

Massacre
During early June 1914, Turkish irregular bands looted the villages south of Menemen, causing the Greek populations to flee. Greek refugees of the surrounding regions poured into nearby Phocaea (Eskifoça and Yeni Foça) on June 11. Phocaea, a coastal town north of Smyrna, comprised ca. 9,000 inhabitants and was predominantly populated by ethnic Greeks.

On June 12, irregular bands launched their attack against Phocaea itself. The attack began during the night from three different sides and was well organized from the beginning. The armed groups broke into several dwellings and shot their inhabitants, irrespective of age and sex, while apart from the killings, several rapes also occurred. German ambassador Wangenheim and American ambassador Henry Morgenthau reported that about fifty people had been killed, while reports of Greek refugees from Phocaea raised the number to 100. The bodies of those massacred were thrown into wells and included priests, old men and children. Dwellings and stores which were already abandoned by the panic-stricken population were systematically looted.

The amount of the looted property was so extensive and widespread that even irregular groups who didn't participate in the massacre and the destruction took part in the share. The surviving civilian population ran to the harbor and tried to escape by boat. Due to the general disorder, some people were drowned while trying to swim in order to save themselves.

On June 25, the Danish consul of Smyrna, Alfred Van de Zee, quoted an eyewitness of the destruction: 

Also, Félix Sartiaux and his excavation team witnessed the massacre. Sartiaux's documented testimony and photos are invaluable in describing the sequence of events before and during the massacre.

The French archaeological mission took drastic measures to help the remaining population and managed to save hundreds of them. They hoisted French flags on their homes and provided shelter whenever possible while the irregular groups were still committing atrocities. According to French archaeologist and eyewitness, Charles Manciet, the Ottoman authorities sent regular troops to Phocaea to deal with the perpetrators, but these troops also participated in the destruction of the town. Manciet mentions that when they left their houses, he saw the most disgraceful acts ever imaginable. He also states that on 17 of June soldiers were sent from İzmir to establish order but these soldiers ended up plundering the town and that the murder and plunder continued until the 18th of June. Manciet states that the atrocities he had witnessed were of an organized nature that aimed at circling Christian peasant populations of the region. He also eyewitness packed camels climbing the mountains through the roads connecting Eski Foça to outside while they were full with the plunder taken from the town.

In addition, the German reporter, Harry Stuermer, who was the correspondent of Kölnische Zeitung newspaper and was usually sympathetic to Turkish authorities later saw the town's "smoking ruins".

Newspapers of that time reported that many Greek refugees, who fled from the region, had bayonet and bullet wounds and they were starving. In addition, they stated that the Turks set on fire some of the Greek properties.

Also, Muslim residents of the town mention the massacre. They also stated that when the Greeks left, their houses were occupied by muhacirs (forced Muslim migrants). According to a local Muslim resident testimony, the local Muslims were happier with Greeks as their sharecroppers compared to having muhacirs and described the members of the chettes (irregular armed forces) as foreigners to the region and cursed them as "rats" who "looted, stole and burned down Greek property". According to another local testimony, "there was so much looting going on… everybody took what was left from Greeks, food, carpets, furniture…". People who belonged to the local networks were radically different in their perception of the Greeks compared to the muhacirs who were alien to the local networks. The local communities favored the Greeks.

Rescue
The Ottoman authorities tried to cover up the incident. However, after two days a French steam tug boat arrived at Smyrna and spread the news about the massacre. The crew had observed a large number of people on the promontory and sent ca. 700 survivors to the nearby Greek island of Lesbos. The Greek authorities there rescued the remaining 5,000–6,000 inhabitants by sending boats to bring them to the island. According to Manciet, the massacre continued until 18 June, when there were no Greek inhabitants left and Phocaea was finally turned into a ghost town.

Aftermath

Right before the massacre, the county reached a population of approximately 23,000 people most of whom were Ottoman Greeks, but after the forced migration and killing of the Ottoman Greeks due to the massacre the population of the entire county decreased down to 4,000.

The events in Phocaea elicited sympathy for the victims in Europe, especially in France. The people of Marseille, which was founded by Phocaeans circa 600 BC, raised a sum of 20,000 French francs to support the refugees.

Similar activity was also carried out by Turkish irregular bands against several other settlements in western Anatolia, while on one occasion almost all inhabitants of the village of Serekieuy, near Menemen, were killed after local Greeks armed themselves for resistance. These attacks against the Ottoman Greeks were performed in manner similar to those undertaken at the time against the Armenian population in eastern provinces of the Ottoman Empire.

During 1914, a total of ca. 154,000 ethnic Greek inhabitants living in the Ottoman Empire lost their homes. With the outbreak of World War I, the Ottoman policies against the Greek communities took a more violent and systematic form and affected a more extensive area, including also Pontus in northern Anatolia. These policies included confiscations of property, as well as the creation of forced labor battalions for all Greek males. Therefore, the Ottoman government deported many Ottoman Greeks to inner Anatolia.

Legacy 
A 2014 documentary film titled "Gegonota sti Fokaia 1914" directed by Agnes Sklavos and Stelio Tatakis has been showcased in the 17th Thessaloniki Documentary Festival.

See also
 Outline and timeline of the Greek genocide

References

Sources

Further reading

External links
  The pillage and massacre at Foça
 Events in Phocaea 1914

1914 in the Ottoman Empire
Mass murder in 1914
Massacres in 1914
June 1914 events
Aidin Vilayet
Foça District
Greek genocide
Persecution of Greeks in the Ottoman Empire in the 20th century
History of İzmir Province
Phocaea
Massacres committed by the Ottoman Empire